West Haven is a city in Weber County, Utah, United States. The population was 10,272 at the 2010 census. It was incorporated on July 1, 1991, combining the unincorporated communities of Kanesville and Wilson.

The confluence of the Weber and Ogden Rivers is located inside the northeastern portion of the city. The city is bordered on the east by Ogden, on the south by Roy, on the west by Hooper, and on the north by Marriott-Slaterville. It is part of the Ogden–Clearfield, Utah Metropolitan Statistical Area.

West Haven has a city park which includes a historical monument. Plans provide for a River Parkway Trail that would include a fishing bridge, a pedestrian tunnel under 21st Street, picnic tables, places to rest and points of historical interest. Plans have this trail connect with the Weber County Centennial Trail. The current mayor is Rob Vanderwood who started his term on January 1, 2022.

Geography
According to the United States Census Bureau, the city has a total area of 10.2 square miles (26.3 km2), all land.

History

Kanesville
The first settlers in what would become Kanesville arrived in 1868.  At the time the area was known as Northwest Hooper.
Kanesville was named for Thomas L. Kane.  The name Kanesville was adopted when an LDS Ward was first organized there in 1882.  The first bishop was Peter B. Peterson.

The name is retained by Kanesville School, a K-6 school in West Haven.  Until October 2010 the Stake of The Church of Jesus Christ of Latter-day Saints in the city was the Kanesville Utah Stake.  On October 17, 2010, the Kanesville Utah Stake was divided and a new stake, the West Haven Utah Stake, was formed.  The old stake retained the Kanesville name.

Wilson
Wilson, Utah was formed in 1854.  It was named after the four Wilson brothers who began farming in the area in 1854.  An irrigation company was formed in 1879 and an LDS Ward was organized in 1882.  The first bishop was Brigham Heber Bingham.

City of West Haven
West Haven installed a citywide sewer system in 2002.  In 1994 the city purchased 40 acres for a park which was then developed with playground equipment and sports fields.  There is also a historical marker in the park.

Demographics

As of the census of 2000, there were 3,976 people, 1,131 households, and 995 families residing in the city. The population density was 391.0 people per square mile (150.9/km2). There were 1,220 housing units at an average density of 120.0 per square mile (46.3/km2). The racial makeup of the city was 94.06% White, 0.48% African American, 0.48% Native American, 0.83% Asian, 0.08% Pacific Islander, 2.29% from other races, and 1.79% from two or more races. Hispanic or Latino of any race were 4.85% of the population.

There were 1,131 households, out of which 52.3% had children under the age of 18 living with them, 79.1% were married couples living together, 6.1% had a female householder with no husband present, and 12.0% were non-families. 9.5% of all households were made up of individuals, and 3.9% had someone living alone who was 65 years of age or older. The average household size was 3.52 and the average family size was 3.77.

In the city, the population was spread out, with 36.9% under the age of 18, 10.0% from 18 to 24, 28.6% from 25 to 44, 18.6% from 45 to 64, and 5.8% who were 65 years of age or older. The median age was 28 years. For every 100 females, there were 103.7 males. For every 100 females age 18 and over, there were 99.8 males.

The median income for a household in the city was $57,120, and the median income for a family was $62,188. Males had a median income of $40,264 versus $30,428 for females. The per capita income for the city was $18,089. About 1.3% of families and 1.8% of the population were below the poverty line, including 1.8% of those under age 18 and 2.0% of those age 65 or over.

A newsletter from the city's mayor in 2009 noted that West Haven was the fastest growing city in Utah in 2008. Much of the city is zoned for commercial development, particularly along the state highway on 1900 West (directly north of the larger community of Roy, Utah, for which 1900 West is the primary north–south main street), and around the 21st Street/Wilson Lane I-15 exit for Ogden and West Haven.  A growing number of businesses are located in the commercial areas (including Wilson Lane and part of Midland Drive) from small shops, larger stores, vehicle sales, repair and service businesses, to small manufacturing operations to substantial enterprises such as steel fabrication.  In general, the size and scope of new development projects has tended to increase since the city's founding.

The predominant single-family home nature of the residential areas - many of which have been created as developments of various sizes - is being joined by more multi-story multi-family dwellings and condominiums.  Some of the old rural nature survives in patches, including farm homes dating back well into the 19th Century, and there are still some working farms raising both crops and animals.

References

External links
 Official Site

 
Cities in Utah
Cities in Weber County, Utah
Populated places established in 1991
1991 establishments in Utah